Gift Banda (born 26 April 1969) is a Zimbabwean politician who is currently the Deputy Mayor of Bulawayo and holds a number of influential positions in Zimbabwean football, including serving as President of Njube Sundowns F.C., Chairman of the ZIFA Southern Region and sits on the board of the Zimbabwe Football Association.

References 

1969 births
Living people
People from Bulawayo
Zimbabwean football managers
Zimbabwean politicians